Uramyini is a tribe of flies in the family Tachinidae.

Genera
Itaplectops Townsend, 1927
Matucania Townsend, 1919
Thelairaporia Guimarães, 1980
Trinitodexia Townsend, 1935
Uramya Robineau-Desvoidy, 1830

References

Dexiinae
Brachycera tribes
Diptera of North America
Diptera of South America